The 2021–22 season is Bolton Wanderers's 133rd season in their history. It covers the period from 1 July 2021 to 30 June 2022. It was the club's first season back in League One following their immediate promotion from League Two the previous season.

Squad

First team

Out on loan

Youth players with first team appearances

Youth players with first team squad numbers

Pre-season friendlies
Bolton Wanderers confirmed they would play friendly matches against Longridge Town, Atherton Collieries, FC United of Manchester, Preston North End, Bamber Bridge Barrow, Chorley Blackburn Rovers and Chester as part of their pre-season schedule. Bolton's friendly against Longridge Town was a clause included as part of the transfer agreement for George Thomason though presumably was delayed a year to allow fans to attend. Longridge also decided to use the match to celebrate their 25th anniversary. The match against Chorley is for the Harold Taylor Memorial Trophy, the first time it has been used since 2017. On June 23 Bolton announced they would have two XI sides play against Norwich City's Norwich City U-23 and Norwich City U-18 teams on July 31 before their match against Blackburn Rovers. Only the match against Norwich U-18 appears to have actually happened, however.

Bolton were meant to have a pre-season training camp in Scotland in early July 2021, however Scotland's government banned travel from Bolton to Scotland due to rising cases in Covid-19 in Bolton. "Essential travel" was permitted, with Bolton's training camp being considered "essential" due to them being elite sportsman – however Bolton decided to cancel the trip as non essential staff weren't allowed to travel in addition to not wanting to become a political tool between Scotland and England over the travel ban.

Mid-season friendlies
On 23 September, Bolton announced the first team would play a friendly against a team consisting of legendary Bolton players on 13 November to help raise money for Gethin Jones's Mother's recovery, as she had been diagnosed with Motor Neurone Disease. A quarter of the money raised would also go to former Bolton player Stephen Darby's charity Darby Rimmer MND Foundation, as he had also suffered from Motor Neurone Disease which had forced him to retire.

Competitions

EFL League One

League table

Results summary

Results by matchday

Matches
The fixtures for the 2021–22 EFL League One season were released on 24 June and saw Bolton opening their campaign at home to Milton Keynes Dons on 7 August. The regular season will conclude on 30 April at home to Fleetwood Town.

FA Cup

Bolton enter the FA Cup at the first round stage, along with all other League One and League Two clubs and were drawn at home to Stockport County.

EFL Cup

Bolton entered the EFL Cup at the first round stage, along with all other League One and League Two club and the majority of Championship clubs. The draw was made on 24 June and saw Bolton face Barnsley in the first round. The tie took place on 10 August and after a goalless draw Bolton won on penalties. This marked the first time in four seasons that Bolton have made it past the first round. They were then drawn away to Wigan Athletic in the second round.

EFL Trophy

On June 23, Bolton were drawn into Group D in the Northern section alongside Rochdale and Port Vale. The day after Liverpool U-21's completed the group. In the knock-out stages, Bolton were drawn away to Hartlepool United.

Statistics

|-
! colspan="14" style="background:#dcdcdc; text-align:center"| Goalkeepers

|-
! colspan="14" style="background:#dcdcdc; text-align:center"| Defenders

|-
! colspan="14" style="background:#dcdcdc; text-align:center"| Midfielders

|-
! colspan="14" style="background:#dcdcdc; text-align:center"| Forwards

|-
! colspan="14" style="background:#dcdcdc; text-align:center"| Player(s) who left the club

|- 
! colspan="14" style="background:#dcdcdc; text-align:center"| Player(s) out on loan

|}

Goals record

Disciplinary record

Transfers

Transfers in

Loans in

Loans out

Transfers out

Notes

References 

Bolton Wanderers F.C. seasons
Bolton Wanderers